Robert Reasoner Nevin (August 2, 1875 – December 31, 1952) was a United States district judge of the United States District Court for the Southern District of Ohio.

Education and career

Born in Dayton, Ohio, Nevin attended Ohio State University and Cincinnati Law School (now the University of Cincinnati College of Law), but read law to enter the bar in 1898. He served as a lieutenant in the United States Army during the Spanish–American War, and was in private practice in Dayton from 1898 to 1903. He was prosecuting attorney of Montgomery County, Ohio from 1906 to 1919.

Federal judicial service

On January 5, 1929, Nevin was nominated by President Calvin Coolidge to a seat on the United States District Court for the Southern District of Ohio vacated by Judge Smith Hickenlooper. Nevin was confirmed by the United States Senate on January 21, 1929, and received his commission the same day. He served as Chief Judge from 1948 until his death on December 31, 1952.

References

Sources
 

1875 births
1952 deaths
Judges of the United States District Court for the Southern District of Ohio
United States district court judges appointed by Calvin Coolidge
20th-century American judges
United States Army officers
United States federal judges admitted to the practice of law by reading law
People from Dayton, Ohio